Double T State Fish and Wildlife Area, also known as the Double 'T' Goose Management Area, is a  State of Illinois recreation area.  It is located within Fulton County, and is administered by the Illinois Department of Natural Resources (IDNR).  The nearest large town is Canton, Illinois.

History and current use
Double T State Fish and Wildlife Area is undergoing remediation as land that was strip mined for coal.  The State of Illinois acquired the land making up this wildlife site in September 2001.  The IDNR states that the area is being targeted for restoration activities and enhancement of wildlife habitat. The park as a whole is managed for hunting, with ducks, geese, and mourning doves featured.

Within the Wildlife Area is Double T Lake, a  lake managed for fishing.  The lake, which formed inside a 1983 strip-mine excavation, is fished for largemouth bass.  The lake also contains carp and gizzard shad.  The geographic shape of the lake, a double-T or π pi shape, gave its name to both the lake and the overall Wildlife Area.

References

External links
 U.S. Geological Survey Map at the U.S. Geological Survey Map Website. Retrieved January 5th, 2022.

State parks of Illinois
Protected areas of Fulton County, Illinois
Protected areas established in 2001
2001 establishments in Illinois